Ami Parekh (born 10 January 1988) is an Indian-American former competitive figure skater, who represented India in international competitions. She is an eight-time Indian ladies' champion. In 2007, she became the first figure skater representing India to compete in a senior ISU event and has competed twice in the World Figure Skating Championships and three times at the Four Continents Figure Skating Championships. Her younger brother Amar Mehta is also a competitive figure skater.

Programs

Competitive highlights

References

External links

 
Ami Parekh's Official Skating Website
2013 Interview with Ami Parekh
Pictures
Tracings.net profile
Asian athlete profile

1988 births
Living people
Sportspeople from Jersey City, New Jersey
People from Bear, Delaware
American female single skaters
Indian female single skaters
American sportspeople of Indian descent
American expatriates in India